Londinium was the name of London, England during the Roman period.

Londinium may also refer to:
 Londinium (film), a 2001 romantic comedy film
 Londinium (album), by the band Archive, or the title song
 "Londinium" (Catatonia song), 1999
 Londinium (Batman), a location in the 1960s television series
 Londinium, a fictional planet in the TV show Firefly